Twistin' the Night Away is the eighth studio album by American singer-songwriter Sam Cooke. Produced by Hugo & Luigi, the album was released in April 1962 in the United States by RCA Victor. Twistin' the Night Away primarily capitalizes on the twist phenomenon and as a result became one of Cooke's most successful LPs, becoming his second to chart and creating a string of chart successes.

Twistin' the Night Away peaked at number 74 on Billboard Top LPs chart, while the single of the same name charted higher at number nine on the Billboard Hot 100.

Background
Twistin' the Night Away originated during the recording team's move to RCA Victor's Hollywood studios. Sammy Lowe, conductor of Cooke's past two albums, brought aboard René Hall, an arranger he had worked with in their days at Keen Records. Hall in turn booked horn players Plas Johnson, Jackie Kelso and Jewell Grant "to spike up what was effectively a return to former glories."

Reception
Bruce Eder of Allmusic wrote that while Cooke was "shoehorned" into doing twist numbers, it remains nevertheless "one of the great dance albums of its period," and "a brilliant soul album as well, which is why it holds up 40 years later." Melody Maker wrote that "Cooke was unique because he was one of the first black artists to keep a tight hand on the direction of his career and the profits thereof," calling the album's hit single a "dance-craze classic."

Track listing
All songs written by Sam Cooke, except where noted.  All songs arranged and conducted by René Hall, except "That's It—I Quit—I'm Movin' On", conducted by Sammy Lowe.

Side one 
 "Twistin' the Night Away" – 2:39
 "Sugar Dumpling" – 2:16
 "Twistin' in the Kitchen with Dinah" – 2:08
 "Somebody's Gonna Miss Me" (Lattimore Brown, Arthur Lee Reeves) – 2:32
 "A Whole Lotta Woman" (James W. Alexander, Lowell Jordan) – 2:20
 "The Twist" (Hank Ballard) – 2:27

Side two 
 "Twistin' in the Old Town Tonight" (Mack David) – 2:08
 "Movin' And A'Groovin'" (Cooke, Lou Rawls) – 2:34
 "Camptown Twist" – 2:13
 "Somebody Have Mercy" – 2:56
 "Soothe Me" – 2:07
 "That's It—I Quit—I'm Movin' On" (Roy Alfred, Del Sorino) – 2:31

Personnel
All credits adapted from The RCA Albums Collection (2011) liner notes.
Sam Cooke – vocals
René Hall – guitar, arrangement, conducting
Sammy Lowe – conductor on "That's It—I Quit—I'm Movin' On"
Clifton White, Al Chernet, Charles Macey, Tommy Tedesco, Bobby Gibbons – guitar
Lloyd Trotman, Red Callender, Jimmy Bond, Ray Pohlman – bass guitar
Panama Francis, Earl Palmer, Sharky Hall – drums
Bobby Donaldson – percussion
Ernest Hayes, Eddie Beal, Marty Harris – piano
Stuart Williamson, John Anderson – trumpet
Larry Altpeter, Albert Godlis, Frank Saracco, John Ewing – trombone
Jackie Kelso, Plas Johnson – tenor saxophone
Jewell Grant – baritone saxophone
Hinda Barnett, Frederick Buldrini, Morris Lefkowitz, Archie Levin, Ben Miller, George Ockner, Sylvan Ockner, Franklin Siegfried, Harry Urbont – violin
Al Schmitt – recording engineer

Charts

Notes

External links 
 Songs of Sam Cooke: Main Page
 Songs of Sam Cooke: Ain't That Good News

1962 albums
Sam Cooke albums
RCA Victor albums
Albums produced by Hugo & Luigi
Albums arranged by René Hall
Albums conducted by René Hall
Albums conducted by Sammy Lowe